The 2019 Porsche Carrera Cup Great Britain was a multi-event, one-make motor racing championship held across England and Scotland. The championship featured a mix of professional motor racing teams and privately funded drivers, competing in Porsche 911 GT3 cars that conformed to the technical regulations for the championship. It formed part of the extensive program of support categories built up around the BTCC centrepiece. The 2019 season was the 17th Porsche Carrera Cup Great Britain season, commencing on 6 April at Brands Hatch – on the circuit's Indy configuration – and finished on 13 October at the same venue, utilising the Grand Prix circuit, after sixteen races at eight meetings. Fourteen of the races were held in support of the 2019 British Touring Car Championship, with a round in support of the 2019–20 FIA World Endurance Championship at Silverstone.

Daniel Harper was the Pro champion driving with JTR, Karl Leonard claimed the Pro-Am title with Team Parker Racing and Justin Sherwood made it a double Team Parker win by dominating the Am class.

Teams and Drivers

The following teams and drivers are currently signed to run the 2019 season.

Race Calendar

Championship standings

Drivers' championships

Overall championship

* Guest entry - not eligible for points

Rookie Category

References

External links
 

Porsche Carrera Cup
Porsche Carrera Cup Great Britain seasons